The lists below comprise the top title-winning professional Go players. Bold names indicate active players.

International

Continental

Total by country
China – 29
Japan – 13
South Korea – 11
Taiwan – 2

China

Japan

South Korea

See also 

 List of Go players
 International Go Federation
 List of professional Go tournaments

References 

All information from gogameworld.com

Go top title holders
Top title holders in Go